Stephen Ray may refer to:

Steve Ray (1906–?), Welsh rugby player
Steve Ray (golfer), in the 1999 World Cup of Golf
Steve Ray, a wrestler from Universal Wrestling Federation (Herb Abrams)

See also

Stephen Rae (disambiguation)
Steve Raymer, American photojournalist, author, and educator
Steve Rayner (1953–2020), British academic known for climate change policy